David Geraghty (born 30 September 1975) is an Irish multi-instrumentalist, composer and songwriter. He is a founding member of Bell X1, and since 2014 has been performing under the moniker Join Me in the Pines.

In 1994 he joined the group Juniper along with Paul Noonan, Damien Rice, Dominic Phillips and Brian Crosby. Damien Rice left Juniper in 1998 to pursue a solo career, and the remaining members reformed as Bell X1, named after the Bell X-1.

Geraghty released his debut solo album Kill Your Darlings on 7 September 2007, while still a member of Bell X1. His debut earned him a nomination for the Choice Music Prize and two Meteor award nominations (Best Album and Best Male).

His second solo album The Victory Dance was released in 2009, coinciding with a nationwide tour which began with a live performance at Electric Picnic in Stradbally, Co. Laois. As "Join Me in the Pines", Geraghty released the albums INHERIT in 2014 and MONOMANIA in 2019.

References

External links 
 
 David Geraghty PR in Ireland
 Bell X1 website

1975 births
Living people
Bell X1 (band) members
Irish guitarists
Irish male guitarists
Irish male singers
Irish pianists
Musicians from County Kildare
People from Leixlip
Male pianists